Jevnaker Idrettsforening is a Norwegian sports club from Jevnaker. It has sections for association football, speed skating, gymnastics and skiing.

Football
The men's football team currently plays in the Third Division, the third tier of Norwegian football, having been relegated from the Second Division in 2011. The team won promotion to the Second Division in 2010, after winning the Buskerud section of the Third Division and a playoff match against Tornado Måløy. It played in the First Division as late as in 1996, and had its previous stint in the Second Division in 1999.

Recent history 
{|class="wikitable"
|-bgcolor="#efefef"
! Season
! 
! Pos.
! Pl.
! W
! D
! L
! GS
! GA
! P
!Cup
!Notes
|-
|2008 
|D3
|align=right |8
|align=right|22||align=right|7||align=right|7||align=right|8
|align=right|43||align=right|45||align=right|28
||
|
|-
|2009 
|D3
|align=right bgcolor=silver|2
|align=right|22||align=right|14||align=right|4||align=right|4
|align=right|68||align=right|35||align=right|46
||
|
|-
|2010 
|D3
|align=right bgcolor=gold|1
|align=right|22||align=right|15||align=right|3||align=right|4
|align=right|62||align=right|41||align=right|48
||
|Promoted
|-
|2011 
|D2
|align=right bgcolor=red|12
|align=right|24||align=right|7||align=right|1||align=right|16
|align=right|42||align=right|64||align=right|22
||1st round
|Relegated
|-
|2012 
|D3
|align=right |5
|align=right|26||align=right|13||align=right|3||align=right|10
|align=right|69||align=right|53||align=right|42
||1st round
|
|-
|2013 (in progress)
|D3
|align=right |3
|align=right|25||align=right|18||align=right|4||align=right|3
|align=right|101||align=right|35||align=right|58
|2nd qualifying round
|
|}

Speed skating and athletics
Speed skaters include Ivar Ballangrud, Sverre Haugli and Maren Haugli.

The club was formerly active in athletics. Two throwers have taken national championship medals for the club. Karl Granli took two silver medals in javelin throw in 1928 and 1929, and bronze medals in 1930 and 1932. Johs Jacobsen won bronze medals in the shot put in 1927 and 1928. The club also arranged the Norwegian Cross-Country Championships, long course (10/20 km) in 1993.

References

External links
 Official site 
 Official site (football) 

Football clubs in Norway
Speed skating clubs in Norway
Sport in Oppland
Jevnaker
Association football clubs established in 1911
1911 establishments in Norway
Defunct athletics clubs in Norway